It's Bad for Ya is the 19th album as well as the 14th and final HBO stand-up comedy special by stand-up comedian George Carlin. It was televised live on March 1, 2008, on HBO, less than four months before Carlin died of heart failure at age 71.

The album is the follow-up to the 2005 HBO special Life Is Worth Losing. Carlin worked on this material since ending his Life Is Worth Losing tour. The working title for this show was The Parade of Useless Bullshit.

Filmed in the Wells Fargo Center for the Arts in Santa Rosa, California, the show's stage behind Carlin was designed to represent a cozy living room theme. The CD was released July 29, 2008, and the DVD and Blu-ray Disc on November 25, 2008.

It's Bad for Ya received the Grammy Award for Best Comedy Album, awarded posthumously.

Track listing
 "Opening" – 1:30
 "Old Fuck" – 3:45
 "Goin' Through My Address Book" – 2:52
 "Things We Say When People Die" – 2:36
 "He's Smiling Down" – 2:11
 "Parents in Hell" – 1:08
 "People Refuse to Be Realistic" – 1:10
 "Dead Parents Helping" – 3:59
 "A Couple of Other Questions" – 1:04
 "Today's Professional Parents" – 5:48
 "The Self-Esteem Movement" – 1:16
 "Every Child Is Special" – 1:42
 "Children Are Our Future" – 0:39
 "Raisin' a Child Is Not Difficult" – 0:42
 "I Like People" – 0:51
 "Stupid Bullshit" – 3:12
 "Stupid Bullshit on the Phone" – 2:33
 "What a Phone Call Should Be" – 0:54
 "In a Coma" – 0:49
 "Their Kids!" – 1:09
 "They Want to Show You the Pictures" – 4:29
 "Just Enough Bullshit" – 1:33
 "No One Questions Things" – 2:55
 "Proud to Be an American" – 1:47
 "God Bless America" – 2:59
 "Takin' Off Yer Hat" – 3:04
 "Swearing on the Bible" – 4:23
 "You Have No Rights" – 5:14

Award and nominations
The live HBO performance special was nominated for an Emmy Award for Outstanding Variety, Music, or Comedy Special at the 60th Primetime Emmy Awards. It lost to Mr. Warmth: The Don Rickles Project.

The audio recording of the special won the Grammy for Best Comedy Album in the 51st Grammy Awards.

Charts

References

External links

 George Carlin's Official Website
 

2000s American television specials
2000s comedy albums
2008 live albums
2008 television specials
Atlantic Records live albums
Eardrum Records live albums
George Carlin live albums
Stand-up comedy albums
Spoken word albums by American artists
Grammy Award for Best Comedy Album
HBO network specials
Live albums published posthumously
Stand-up comedy concert films